Glenfields can refer to:
 Glenfields, Leicestershire, England, containing the village of Glenfield
 Glenfields (Philipstown, New York), United States, listed historic building

See also
Glenfield (disambiguation)